George Mather Prince (April 5, 1918 – June 9, 2009) was an American author and the co-creator of synectics with William J. J. Gordon.

Prince was born in Richmond, New York to Howard Prince, a surgeon, and Marguerite Prince. He grew up in Rochester, New York and attended Phillips Exeter Academy and Williams College. He joined the Arthur D. Little Consulting Company when he heard about the creativity experiments going on there.

George Prince died in Weston, Massachusetts at the age of 91.

Works
Books
The Practice of Creativity: A Manual for Dynamic Group Problem-Solving. George M. Prince, 2012, Vermont: Echo Point Books & Media,  
The Practice of Creativity. George M. Prince, 1970, New York: Collier Books, Div. of Macmillan Publishing, Co. Inc.
Mindspring! George M. Prince, Private printing, Copyright 1980
Your Life is a Series of Meetings - Get a Good Life George M. Prince with Kathleen Logan-Prince, 2002 1st Books Library, www.1stbooks.com
Culture and Creativity, George M. Prince, working manuscript, 2003
Managing the Field, George M. Prince, workshop manual, 1988
Mind-Free Program - Player/Coach Manual George M. Prince, 1988
An Experiment to Examine and Reduce Self-Punishment George M. Prince, unpublished manuscript, 1988

Articles
"How to Be a Better Meeting Chairman," Harvard Business Review, Jan. 1969.
"Synectics: Twenty-five Years of Research into Creativity and Group Process," American Society for Training and Development,1982.
"Synectics Group Planning and Problem-Solving Methods in Engineering," John Wiley & Sons,1982.
"Recognizing Genuine Teamwork," Supervisory Management, April 1989.
"Creative Meetings Through Power Sharing," Harvard Business Review, July 1, 1972.
"Mindspring: Suggesting Answers to Why Productivity is Low," Chem Tech, May 1976.
"Creativity and Learning As Skills, Not Talents," The Philips-Exeter Bulletin,June - July 1980.
"Creativity, Self and Power," Perspectives in Creativity, edited by Irving A. Taylor & J.W. Getzels, Aldine Publishing Company, Chicago, 1975.
"Training Both Sides of the Brain to Work Together," Training/HRD magazine 	*"Liberating Creativity and Learning," Chapter in Creative Education: Educating a Nation of Innovators, V.C. Nolan, editor, Synectics Education Initiative, Stoke Mandeville

References

External links
George Prince website

2009 deaths
Writers from New York (state)
1918 births
20th-century American businesspeople
20th-century American non-fiction writers